The Dos Bocas Formation is a Chattian, about 26 to 24 Ma, (Deseadan in the SALMA classification) geologic formation of the Progreso Basin in southwestern Ecuador.

Description 
The formation comprises moderately-sorted, fine to medium sandstones with angular quartz-feldspathic clasts. Conspicuous rounded green grains are probably glauconite, but berthierine cannot be dismissed. The matrix is micritic and volcanogenic, possibly bentonitic. The formation was deposited in an estuarine to mid shelf environment. Fossils of sharks, turtles and the tropical Urkudelphis were recovered from the formation.

Fossil content 
The formation has provided fossils of:
 Carcharocles angustidens
 Urkudelphis chawpipacha
 Chelonioidea indet.

See also 
 List of fossiliferous stratigraphic units in Ecuador

References

Bibliography

Further reading 
 

Geologic formations of Ecuador
Oligocene Series of South America
Paleogene Ecuador
Chattian Stage
Deseadan
Sandstone formations
Tidal deposits
Open marine deposits
Paleontology in Ecuador
Formations